The Albert and Temmy Latner Jewish Public Library in Toronto, Ontario, Canada was founded in 1941 as the Jewish Public Library by bookseller Ben Zion Hyman. The library began as a small independent collection located at Hyman's storefront on Spadina Avenue in the late 1930s until 1941 when the public library was formally established and moved to a set of rooms in the College Street and Spadina Avenue area. It later moved to the intersection of Markham Street and Harbord Street and then Glen Park and Glenmount Avenues. In 1983, it settled in its final location in the Lipa Green Building at 4600 Bathurst Street.

The library became part of the Latner Centre of Jewish Knowledge and Heritage in 2005. However, the centre disbanded in 2008 and the library closed at that time "due to a lack of resources and a decline in circulation of books being taken out." The former library's books and resources were kept in a storage facility until 2016, when the library's collection was acquired by Mizrahi Bookstore, of Brooklyn, New York.

See also
Jewish Public Library (Montreal)
Jewish Virtual Library
Library Of Agudas Chassidei Chabad

References

External links
Map and Information of the Toronto Jewish Public Library
Article on sale of the library

Jewish educational organizations
Jewish Canadian literature
Jewish libraries
Jewish organizations based in Canada
Jews and Judaism in Toronto
Libraries in Toronto
Defunct libraries
Defunct Jewish organizations
Defunct organizations based in Canada
Organizations disestablished in 2008
Libraries established in 1941
Libraries disestablished in 2008